Gamze Nur Yaman (born April 25, 1999) is a Turkish women's football goalkeeper, who plays for Galatasaray with jersey number 32. She was a member of the Turkey women's national under-19 team before she was admitted to the Turkey women's national team.

Early life
Gamze Nur Yaman was born in the Gaziosmanpaşa district of Istanbul Province, Turkey on April 25, 1999.

Playing career

Club

Beşiktaş
Yaman obtained her license from Beşiktaş J.K. on May 30, 2015. Her debut came in the 2014–15 season of the Turkish Women's Third League. Becoming league champion, her team was promoted to the Turkish Second League in the 2015–16 season. Beşiktaş J.K. finished the season as champion, and was again promoted to the First League in the 2016–17 season.

She is the team's goalkeeper. İn the end of the 2018-19 First Leafue season, she enjoyed her team's champion title.

ALG Spor
By end September 2019, Yaman moved to ALG Spor in Gaziantep.

WFC Zhytlobud-1 Kharkiv
After two seasons with ALG Spor, she went on 21 September 2020 to Ukraine to join WFC Zhytlobud-1 Kharkiv in the 2020–21 Vyshcha Liha.

Galatasaray
On 3 March 2022, the Turkish Women's Football Super League team was transferred to the Galatasaray club.

International

Yaman was admitted to the Turkey women's U-19 team, and played her first game at the UEFA Development Tournament against Slovenia on June 9, 2016. The women's U-19 team became champion of the tournament.

She was called up to the national U-19 team again to play at the 2017 UEFA Women's Under-19 Championship qualification – Group 10 matches. She took part also in one match of the 2018 UEFA Women's Under-19 Championship qualification – Group 10, and three matches of the 2018 UEFA Women's Under-19 Championship qualification – Elite round Group 4.

On 11 November 2018, she debuted in the Turkey women's national football team playing in the friendly match against Georgia. She took part in three UEFA Women's Euro 2022 qualifying Group A matches.

Career statistics
.

Honours

Club
Turkish Women's First League
 Beşiktaş J.K.
 Winners (1): 2018–19
 Runners-up (2): 2016–17, 2017–18

Turkish Women's Second League
 Beşiktaş J.K.
 Winners (1): 2015–16

Turkish Women's Third League
 Beşiktaş J.K.
 Winners (1): 2014–15

International
UEFA Development Tournament
 Turkey women's U-19
 Winners (1): 2016

References

External links

Living people
1999 births
People from Gaziosmanpaşa
Footballers from Istanbul
Turkish women's footballers
Women's association football goalkeepers
Beşiktaş J.K. women's football players
ALG Spor players
Turkey women's international footballers
Turkish expatriate women's footballers
Expatriate women's footballers in Ukraine
Turkish expatriate sportspeople in Ukraine
WFC Zhytlobud-1 Kharkiv players
Galatasaray S.K. women's football players